Mordovian Erzia Museum of Visual Arts is a museum in the city of Saransk in the Mordovian Republic.

Mordovian Erzia Museum of Visual Arts holds the world's largest collection of more than 200 works done by the famous sculptor of the 20th century Stepan Dmitrievich Erzia. The museum also contains collection of works of Mordovian folk artists, such as Fedot Sychkov, and Ivan Makarov. Both of them, as well as Erzia were born in Mordovia. The museum exhibits collections of all the major art forms: painting, drawing, sculpture. There are also expositions and collections of Russian art of the 18th and 19th centuries and of the modern Russian and Mordovian art as well. In 2002, the museum was classified by the Government of Mordovia as one of the most valuable objects of cultural heritage of Mordovian people.

History of the museum
In 1941, soon after establishing of the Union of Mordovian artists it was decided to found a gallery in order to stimulate young artists and to promote art among working class. On March 14, 1941, in accordance with the resolution of the Counscil of National Mordovian Comissars, the gallery of arts was opened in Saransk. The World War II prevented the establishment of the museum in Saransk. The issue was raised again in 1950's. There were many new artists, some of them were the soldiers who had come back from the war, joined the Union. On January 10, 1960 they established the Mordovian Republican gallery named after a famous Mordovian artist Fedor Sychkov. Also, the museum received a big collection of works of Mordovian famous sculptor Stepan Erzia.

At first the museum was in a single-storey building on Sovetskaya Street, but when the permanent exhibition of Erzia sculptures was moved in, the museum was given with another building. The modern building of the museum was given after Erzia’s 100’s anniversary.

In 1978 the Gallery was reorganised into Mordovian Erzia Museum of Visual Arts.

In 2004 the painter and designer Lyudmila Narbekova became the head of the museum.

Buildings

The main museum building
The main museum infrastructure consists of two buildings standing side by side. The west wing was built in 1976 (architect V. Sologub), by the 100th anniversary of Erzia. In 1985 the second building was constructed next to the first one. They are connected by the gallery on the 2nd floor. In 2001, on the 125th anniversary of Erzia, the museum was reconstructed and its appearance was greatly improved.

The exhibition hall
The exhibition hall of the museum (Sovetskaya street, 29, Saransk, Russia), was built in the mid 1950s by the architect S. Levkov.

Affiliates of the museum

External links
 Biography and paintings of F. Sychkov
 Biography of S. Erzia
 International fund of arts named after S. D. Erzia
 Mordovian Erzia Museum of Visual Arts
 Government of Mordovia

References

Museums in Mordovia
Art museums and galleries in Russia
Saransk
Cultural heritage monuments in Mordovia
Objects of cultural heritage of Russia of regional significance